Cattleya violacea is a species of orchid native to the lowland rainforests of the Amazon and Orinoco river basins, being the most widespread of all Cattleya species in the wild. Orchids of this species grow on trees along rivers, as they require heat and moisture year round.

References

External links

violacea
violacea
Flora of Peru
Flora of Bolivia
Flora of Brazil
Flora of Guyana
Flora of Ecuador
Flora of Colombia
Flora of Venezuela
Flora of Suriname